Ilex amygdalina is a tree in the family Aquifoliaceae that is native to South America.

References

amygdalina
Trees of Peru
Trees of Bolivia